The Lake Catherine State Park-Bridge No. 2 is a historic bridge, carrying Arkansas Highway 171 across an unnamed stream in the western part of Lake Catherine State Park in Hot Spring County, Arkansas. The bridge is a rustic stone structure, with stone abutments rising to low piers just above the roadway at its four corners. Built in 1935 by crews of the Civilian Conservation Corps, it is one of a number of surviving CCC-built structures in the park.

The bridge was listed on the National Register of Historic Places in 1992.

See also
Lake Catherine State Park CCC Cabins
List of bridges documented by the Historic American Engineering Record in Arkansas
List of bridges on the National Register of Historic Places in Arkansas
National Register of Historic Places listings in Hot Spring County, Arkansas

References

External links

Road bridges on the National Register of Historic Places in Arkansas
Bridges completed in 1935
Historic American Engineering Record in Arkansas
National Register of Historic Places in Hot Spring County, Arkansas
Stone bridges in the United States
1935 establishments in Arkansas
Transportation in Hot Spring County, Arkansas
Rustic architecture in Arkansas
Civilian Conservation Corps in Arkansas
Bridge No. 2